Ralph C. Herz (March 25, 1878 – July 12, 1921) was an actor and singer born of American parents in France. He spent the majority of his career in the United States. He appeared in vaudeville, was popular in musical plays and was often on Broadway. He made a handful of silent films before his death at 43 from diabetes in 1921. Herz was at one time married to musical star Lulu Glaser.

Filmography
The Purple Lady (1916)
 The Mystery of No. 47 (1917)
The Matinee Idol (1917) short
Married But Single (1917) short
Winning an Heiress (1917) short
The Love Dope (1917) short
The Regeneration of Reginald (1917) short

References

External links
Ralph Herz Internet Movie Database
Ralph Herz about 1912 (University of Louisville, Macauley Theater collection)
poster with Herz and ?Irene Howley on cover

1878 births
1921 deaths
Actors from Paris
American male actors
American male singers
American expatriates in France